The Istanbul Lutheran Church (ILK) is small national Turkish-speaking Lutheran church body in Turkey. It was officially founded December 22, 2004. The Parish is led by council of elders together with presiding pastor Ville Typpö. Istanbul Lutheran Church have two parishes in Turkey: Istanbul Parish and Izmir Parish. And two Parishes in Bulgaria: Peshtera Parish and Chapel Parish in Krushevo village (belongs to Parvomay City). November 2006 Turkish-speaking Lutheran Parish in Mannheim, Germany, joined Istanbul Lutheran Church. Istanbul Lutheran Church has approximately 120 members. Lutheranism has been in Turkey since 1709, when Sweden sent first Lutheran priest to Constantinople. Istanbul Lutheran Church's weekly activities are Church services, Bible study groups, Sunday schools and Bible classes.

Doctrine
In brochure of Istanbul Lutheran Church is following statement: "Istanbul Lutheran Church confesses the Christian faith based on the Holy Bible, the witness of the Old and New Testaments to the Triune God, the Father, the Son and the Holy Spirit. This faith is expressed in three ecumenical creeds and in the Lutheran Confessions."

External links
Official Websites in English
Official Websites in Turkish
Prochure of Istanbul Lutheran Church
Sharing the faith in Turkey: An interview with the head of the Istanbul Lutheran Church

References

Lutheran denominations